Samuel Warren Dike (1839–1913) was an American Congregational clergyman, born at Thompson, Conn.  He graduated at Williams College in 1863 and at Andover Theological Seminary in 1866.  Intent on reforming the laws of divorce, he organized the Divorce Reform League (National League for the Protection of the Family) in 1881.

References

American activists
People from Thompson, Connecticut
1839 births
1913 deaths
Williams College alumni
Divorce law